Shane Grice (born December 20, 1976) is a former American football guard and tight end who played one game in the National Football League (NFL) for the Tampa Bay Buccaneers and five seasons in the Arena Football League (AFL) for the Georgia Force. He played college football at Ole Miss.

Early life and education
Shane Grice was born on December 20, 1976, in Tupelo, Mississippi. He attended Shannon High School, graduating in c. 1997, before joining the Itawamba Community College, where he played one season in football. In 1998, he transferred to the University of Mississippi, where he played three seasons for their Ole Miss Rebels football team. Grice was a starter in 26 games for the Rebels, and helped them have the seventh-fewest sacks given up in the nation as a senior.

Professional career
After going unselected in the 2001 NFL Draft, Grice was signed by the Tampa Bay Buccaneers as an undrafted free agent. He was released at the final roster cuts on August 27.

Grice was later signed to the practice squad of the Chicago Bears, before being re-signed to the active roster by the Buccaneers on September 26. He spent seven games on the inactive list before being released. Grice was later signed to the Buccaneers practice squad, before being promoted to the active roster for the season finale against the Philadelphia Eagles. He made his NFL debut in the game. He was released by the Buccaneers after the third preseason game in August .

Near the end of the 2002 season, Grice was signed to the practice squad of the Chicago Bears, but did not appear in any games.

In 2003, Grice was sent to the Barcelona Dragons of NFL Europe, where he appeared in ten games, nine as a starter. He returned to the Bears following the NFL Europe season end, but did not make the final roster.

In 2004, Grice was signed by the Georgia Force of the Arena Football League (AFL). In his first season with the team, he appeared in all 11 games, making 9.5 tackles, a sack, and a fumble recovery. He was also used as a tight end, and made one catch for six yards. He ended up playing five seasons with the Force, earning second-team All-Arena honors in 2008, his last season, after starting all 16 games. He finished his career with seven catches for 39 yards and a touchdown on offense, and 15 tackles on defense.

References

1976 births
Living people
Players of American football from Mississippi
American football offensive guards
American football tight ends
Ole Miss Rebels football players
Tampa Bay Buccaneers players
Chicago Bears players
Georgia Force players